The Dahomeyean Progressive Union (UPD) was a political party in Dahomey.

History
The party was established in April 1946 by Augustin Kokou Azango and Émile Derlin Zinsou, and was the first political party in the territory. It was initially affiliated with the African Democratic Rally, but dropped its link in 1948. A breakaway in 1946 lead to the creation of the African People's Bloc, but the party still won the 1946–47 General Council elections, taking 20 of the 30 seats.

Another breakaway occurred between 1950 and 1951, when Hubert Maga left the UPD to establish the Ethnic Group of the North under encouragement from Roger Péperty,  the northern area's French administrator. Sourou-Migan Apithy also left the party in 1951 to establish the Republican Party of Dahomey.

After losing the 1952 Territorial Assembly elections to the Republican Party of Dahomey, the UPD formed an alliance with the African People's Bloc, which led to the creation of the Dahomeyan Democratic Union in 1955.

References

Defunct political parties in Benin
Rassemblement Démocratique Africain
Political parties established in 1946
Political parties disestablished in 1955